Joseph Murray was a Scottish professional footballer who played as a winger for clubs including Dundee, Grimsby Town and Macclesfield.

References

Footballers from Aberdeen
Scottish footballers
Association football wingers
Dundee F.C. players
Grimsby Town F.C. players
Macclesfield Town F.C. players
English Football League players